Thomas Drescher (born 24 November 1978 in Bad Nauheim) is a German former footballer who last played for 1. FC Eschborn. He spent two seasons in the Bundesliga with 1. FC Kaiserslautern.

References

External links
 

1978 births
Living people
German footballers
Rot-Weiss Frankfurt players
1. FC Kaiserslautern players
SV Wacker Burghausen players
SV Elversberg players
SV Eintracht Trier 05 players
Bundesliga players
2. Bundesliga players
Association football defenders
People from Bad Nauheim
Sportspeople from Darmstadt (region)
Footballers from Hesse